Ro-30 may refer to:

 IMAM Ro.30, an Italian observation biplane of 1932
 , an Imperial Japanese Navy submarine in commission from 1924 to 1938